Colombes is a commune in the northwestern suburbs of Paris, France. In 2019, Colombes was the 53rd largest city in France.

Name
The name Colombes comes from Latin columna (Old French colombe), meaning "column". This is interpreted as referring either to a megalithic column used in ancient times by a druidic cult which stood in Colombes until its destruction during the French Revolution, or to the columns of an atrium in a ruined Gallo-Roman villa that also stood in Colombes.

History
On 13 March 1896, 17% of the territory of Colombes was detached and became the commune of Bois-Colombes (literally "Colombes Woods"). On 2 May 1910, 19% of the (reduced) territory of Colombes was detached and became the commune of La Garenne-Colombes. Thus, the commune of Colombes is now only two-thirds the size of its territory before 1896. The population data in the table and graph below refer to the commune of Colombes proper, in its geography at the given years.

Population

Geography

Climate

Colombes has a oceanic climate (Köppen climate classification Cfb).

Administration

The city is divided into two cantons: 
 Colombes-1 (north)
 Colombes-2 (south)

Transport
Colombes is served by four stations on the Transilien Paris – Saint-Lazare suburban rail line at Colombes, Le Stade, La Garenne-Colombes and Les Vallées.

Education
The commune has 21 preschools and 19 elementary schools.

Secondary schools:
 Junior high schools: Robert Paparemborde, Marguerite Duras, Gay Lussac, Moulin Joly, Jean-Baptiste Clément, Lakanal
 Senior high schools: Lycée Guy de Maupassant, Lycee Polyvalent Claude Garamont, Lycee Polyvalent Anatole de France

Personalities
Quilapayún, Chilean music group forced into exile in France after the 1973 Coup. They settled in Colombes.
Jordan Aboudou, basketball player
Lens Aboudou, basketball player
Josue Albert, footballer
Bryan Alceus, footballer
Mame-Ibra Anne, athlete
Jean-Ricner Bellegarde, footballer
Kelly Berville, footballer  
Zoumana Camara, footballer
Pierre Clayette, artist
Mathieu Cossou, karateka
Simone Jorry, deaf/hoh rights activist
Marie-Antoinette Katoto, footballer
Claude Mérelle, actress
Eliaquim Mangala, footballer
Samuel Nadeau, basketball player
Alexandre Postel (born 1982), writer
Steven Nzonzi, footballer
Kevin Thalien, basketball player
Elodie Thomis, footballer 
Axel Tony, singer
Jonathan Toto, footballer 
Eddy Viator, footballer
Rama Yade, politician, moved into a council flat in Colombes with her mother and three sisters at the age of fourteen.
pierpoljak, reggae singer

Sport
The stadium was built in 1907. Officially named the Stade Olympique Yves-du-Manoir, the Olympic Stadium of Colombes was the site of the opening ceremony and several events of the 1924 Summer Olympics. The arena's capacity was increased to 60,000 for the 1938 World Cup.  The stadium lost its importance after the restoration in 1972 of Paris' 49,000-seat Parc des Princes.  In the 1990s, three of the four grandstands were torn down due to decay and the stadium's capacity was down to 7,000; later renovations have brought the current capacity to 14,000.

Through November 2017, it had been home to the Racing 92 rugby club, currently playing in France's Top 14, but Racing has since moved to the new U Arena in Nanterre. The RCF Paris football club, which plays in the fourth division, remains at Yves-du-Manoir. The stadium will be the field hockey venue at the 2024 Summer Olympics.

Twin towns
 Frankenthal, Germany

See also
Communes of the Hauts-de-Seine department

References

External links

 Official website
  Colombes in postal card (Colombes philatelic society)
  History of the Olympic Stadium
 Article: Chariots of Fire stadium reprieved

Communes of Hauts-de-Seine
Cities in Île-de-France